E Bija e Hënës dhe e Diellit ("the Daughter of the Moon and the Sun") is a character in Albanian mythology and folklore. She is the lightning of the sky which falls everywhere from heaven on the mountains and the valleys and strikes pride and evil. In the legends she helps a hero winning a fight against a kulshedra. Sometimes described with a star on her forehead and a moon on her chest, her victory over the kulshedra symbolizes the supremacy of the deity of the sky over that of the underworld.

Mythology 
In Albanian folk beliefs the sun (Dielli) and the moon (Hëna) are personified deities. In folk tales, myths and legends the sun appears as a male figure, and the moon as a female figure. In some traditions the sun and the moon are regarded as husband and wife, and in other traditions as brother and sister. In the case of E Bija e Hënës dhe e Diellit the sun is her father and the moon is her mother. E Bija e Hënës dhe e Diellit is described as the lightning of the sky which falls everywhere from heaven on the mountains and the valleys and strikes pride and evil. In the legends she helps a hero in his fight against a kulshedra. In a tradition she is described as bearing a star on her forehead and a moon on her chest. The supremacy of E Bija e Hënës dhe e Diellit over the kulshedra reflects the victory of the deity of the sky over that of the underworld, showing that the symbols of heaven win.

In literature 
The legend of E Bija e Hënës dhe e Diellit has also been narrated by the Albanian writer Mitrush Kuteli in the collection Tregime të moçme shqiptare ("Old Albanian tales"), published in 1965.

References

Citations

Bibliography

Albanian mythology
Albanian legendary creatures
Sky and weather deities